Nicolas Perrenot de Granvelle (1486–1550) was a Franc-Comtois politician who served as a close trusted adviser to Emperor Charles V. He was made suzerain of the imperial city of Besançon and held an influential position in the Netherlands. From 1530 until his death he was one of the emperor's most trusted advisers in Germany. He was the father of the cardinal and politician Antoine Perrenot de Granvelle, also a leading Habsburg minister, and built the Palace Granvelle in Besançon.

Life 
In 1518 he became a lawyer and was called at the age of 34 years to the Parliament of the Free County of Burgundy. 

In 1519 Charles V was elected emperor at the age of 19 years. Nicolas Perrenot de Granvelle quickly became a closely trusted advisor and was appointed chancellor of the empire. His sons and sons-in-law (Granvelle family) went on to occupy prominent positions at the imperial court.

In 1527 he bought the seigniory of Grandvelle, located in the Bailiwick of Amont (Bailliage d'Amont), administrative territory located in present-day Haute-Saône department, which later became better known under the name of Granvelle. In 1530, after the death of Mercurino Gattinara, he became one of the emperor's most trusted advisers in the Holy Roman Empire, and played that role until his death.

He died on August 27, 1550, at the age of 64 years, while attending the Imperial Diet in Augsburg. He owned a significant art collection and library, the later now in the Bibliothèque municipale de Besançon.

Succession 
In 1513, he married Nicole de Bonvalot daughter of Jacques de Bonvalot, lord of Champagney. The couple had 15 children, three of whom went on to play prominent political roles. The eldest surviving son, Antoine Perrenot de Granvelle, become Archbishop of Mechelen and a cardinal as well as serving as a diplomat and adviser to Charles V. Another son, Jérôme de Perrenot, became a diplomat in the service of Ferdinand I, Holy Roman Emperor and guardian of the young William the Silent. The youngest son, Frédéric Perrenot de Champagney, served the Habsburgs as a soldier and diplomat.

From modest beginnings in the Franche-Comté, the Perrenot family in two generations became the most powerful and the richest in the region. The Granvelle Palace in Besançon is the symbol of their rapid success and social ascent.

References

Further reading 
 Wilhelm Maurenbrecher: Granvelle, Nicolaus Perrenot von. In: Allgemeine Deutsche Biographie (ADB). Band 9. Duncker & Humblot, Leipzig 1879, pp. 580–584

1486 births
1550 deaths
Politicians from Besançon
French diplomats
16th-century people of the Holy Roman Empire
Burials at Besançon Cathedral